The County Governor of Telemark was the county governor for Telemark county in Norway from 1661 until the office was abolished in 2019. The office of county governor is a government agency of the Kingdom of Norway which represents the national government in each county. The county governor is an appointed position. On 1 January 2019, this office was merged with the County Governor of Vestfold into the County Governor of Vestfold og Telemark (this was done in preparation for the merger of the two counties in 2020).

The governor is the government's representative in the county. They carry out the resolutions and guidelines of the Storting and government. This is done first by the county governor performing administrative tasks on behalf of the ministries. Secondly, the county governor also monitors the activities of the municipalities and is the appeal body for many types of municipal decisions.

History
In 1661, the government of Norway established Bratsberg as an amt (or county). The county was subordinate to the Diocesan Governor of Christianssand. On 1 January 2019, the office was merged creating the new office of County Governor of Vestfold og Telemark in preparation for the merger of the neighboring counties of Telemark and Vestfold to form Vestfold og Telemark county on 1 January 2020.

Title
The word for county (amt or fylke) and the name of the county have both changed over time. Therefore the title of the officeholder has also changed.

List of officeholders
Telemark county has had the following governors:

References

Telemark